Michael Evans Osborne (28 September 1941 – 19 September 2007) was an English jazz alto saxophonist, pianist, and clarinetist who was a member of the band Brotherhood of Breath in the 1960s and 1970s.

Biography
Mike Osborne was born in Hereford, England, and attended Wycliffe College in Gloucestershire and the Guildhall School of Music. From 1962 to 1972, Osborne belonged to the Mike Westbrook band. During this period the artist also worked with musicians such as Michael Gibbs, Mike Cooper, Stan Tracey, Kenny Wheeler, Humphrey Lyttelton, Alan Skidmore, John Surman, Harry Miller, Alan Jackson (drums), John Mumford (trombone) and Lionel Grigson. During 1974–75, Osborne was part of the saxophone trio S.O.S. with John Surman and Alan Skidmore. They recorded an LP plus BBC radio and television sessions and toured extensively in Europe.

Health issues hastened the end of his career in 1982, and he returned to Hereford, where he was living under care at the time of his death in 2007, aged 65.

Select discography
 Mike Osborne Quintet: Outback (Turtle); with Chris McGregor (piano), Harry Miller (bass), and Louis Moholo (drums)
 Mike Osborne Trio: Border Crossing (Ogun)
 Mike Osborne Trio: All Night Long (Live at Willisau) (Ogun)
 Mike Osborne & Stan Tracey: Original (Cadillac)
 Mike Osborne Force of Nature (REEL)
 Mike Osborne/Stan Tracey Duo (Cadillac)
 Tandem: Mike Osborne/Stan Tracey Live at the Bracknell Festival (Ogun)
 Mike Osborne Quintet: Marcel's Muse (Ogun)
 Shapes (Future Music)

With Brotherhood of Breath
 Procession (Live at Toulouse) (Ogun)
 Travelling Somewhere (Cuneiform)
 Bremen to Bridgwater (Cuneiform)
 Eclipse at Dawn (Cuneiform)

With Barry Guy/London Jazz Composers' Orchestra
 Ode (Incus, 1972)

With John Surman
 John Surman (Deram)
 How Many Clouds Can You See? (Deram)

With John Surman and Alan Skidmore
 SOS (1975) (Ogun)

With Mike Westbrook
 The Mike Westbrook Concert Band: Marching Song Vols. 1 & 2 (Deram)
 The Mike Westbrook Concert Band: Release (Deram)

With Michael Gibbs
 Michael Gibbs (Deram)

With Mike Cooper
 Too Late Now (Dawn)
 Your Lovely Ways (Dawn)
 Life and Death in Paradise (Fresh Air)

With Alan Skidmore
 Alan Skidmore Quintet: T.C.B. (Philips)

With Kenny Wheeler
 Song for Someone (Incus, 1973)

With Harry Miller's Isipingo
 Which Way Now: Live in Bremen 1975 (Cuneiform)
 Family Affair (Ogun)

With Norma Winstone
 Edge of Time (Algo)

Select bibliography

Ian Carr: Music Outside: Contemporary Jazz in Britain, 2nd edition (London: Northway Publications, 2007)

References

External links
Obituary in The Times, 2 October 2007
Mike Osborne Complete Discography
Jason Ankeny, Mike Osborne biography at AllMusic

1941 births
2007 deaths
English jazz alto saxophonists
British male saxophonists
English jazz pianists
People educated at Wycliffe College, Gloucestershire
Deaths from lung cancer
20th-century pianists
20th-century English musicians
20th-century saxophonists
British male pianists
20th-century British male musicians
20th-century British musicians
British male jazz musicians
FMR Records artists
Ogun Records Artists